Parinari excelsa, the Guinea plum, is a species of large, evergreen tree in the family Chrysobalanaceae. It has a very wide distribution in tropical Africa and South America.

Description
The trunk is cylindrical, or slightly sinuous, usually branchless in its lower half, with large buttresses at the base. The bark is greyish, either rough with warty lenticels, or deeply fissured and peeling away in flakes. The twigs are golden-brown and slightly hairy. The leaves are alternate, simple and entire, with small stipules and short petioles. They have rounded bases and tapering apexes; the upper sides are bare but the undersides are densely felted with brown or grey hairs.

Distribution and habitat

Parinari excelsa is native to the forests of tropical Africa and also grows in South America. In Africa its range extends from Senegal to Sudan, and southward to Angola and Mozambique. In South America its range extends from Costa Rica southward and eastward to Bolivia, Peru and Brazil. It sometimes springs up in clear-felled areas, often in patches growing from seeds or root suckers, and may come to dominate parts of regenerating secondary forest.

Ecology
The fruits are attractive to elephants, which disperse the seeds in their dung; the tree does not regenerate well in mature forest, but does so in clearings and alongside tracks. The Sanje mangabey in Tanzania also feeds on the fruit, cracking open the hard seeds with their powerful premolar teeth.

At the Taï National Park on the Ivory Coast, chimpanzees consume a significant quantity of P. excelsa fruit.

References

External links

excelsa
Flora of Africa
Flora of South America
Flora of Costa Rica
Miombo
Afromontane flora
Plants described in 1824